Friedrich Geiger (24 November 1907 – 13 June 1996) was a German automobile designer whose most notable cars, the pre-World War II Mercedes-Benz 540K and post-war Mercedes-Benz 300SL, are among the most highly regarded in automotive history.

Biography
Born in Süßen in the Swabian region of southern Germany, Geiger originally trained as a cartwright, before studying as a design engineer at University prior to joining Daimler-Benz in April 1933. He began in the special vehicles manufacturing department, where, in the 1930s, he was responsible for the 500K and 540K sports cars.

Geiger left Daimler-Benz in April 1948, but returned to the company two years later, this time as a test engineer in the styling department. He became head of styling within a few years, after designing the 300SL gullwing coupé, named one of the ten greatest Mercedes ever built and one of the 25 greatest cars of the 20th century.

Geiger continued to work at Daimler-Benz until his retirement in December 1973, by which time he had helped create the W111/W112 (1959) and W110 (1961) "Fintails", the W113 "Pagoda" (1963) and R107 (1971) SL coupé/convertibles, the W108/109 (1965) and W116 (1972) series of the S-Class, and the Mercedes-Benz 600 limousine (1963).

Geiger was succeeded by Bruno Sacco, one of his staff at the styling department.

Geiger died in Bad Überkingen in 1996, aged 88.

Gallery

Notes

References
 
 
 

1907 births
1996 deaths
German automobile designers